The Greenville Mets was the name of an American minor league baseball franchise representing Greenville, South Carolina, that played for the  and  seasons in the Class A Western Carolinas League.  It played its home games at Meadowbrook Park and produced future Baseball Hall of Fame pitcher and strikeout king Nolan Ryan as well as another hurler, Jerry Koosman, who would go on to star on the New York Mets'  1969 "Miracle Mets" team.

Greenville was represented in the WCL from 1963–1972, taking its nicknames from its various parent organizations. The Mets succeeded the Milwaukee Braves as the Major League Baseball parents of the Greenville franchise after the  campaign. Koosman played on the 1965 club, posting a lacklustre 5-11 won/lost record and an earned run average of 4.71.  But Ryan dominated the 1966 Western Carolinas League. He won 17 games, lost only two, and struck out 272 batters in 183 innings pitched. The Greenville Mets also produced future MLB players Duffy Dyer, Ed Figueroa and Dick Selma, among others. 

The Mets moved to the Florida State League in 1967 and the Boston Red Sox became parents of the Greenville WCL club.

References
 Johnson, Lloyd, and Wolff, Miles, eds., The Encyclopedia of Minor League Baseball, 3d edition. Durham, N.C.: Baseball America, 2007.

External links
 Western Carolinas League (A) Encyclopedia and History, Baseball Reference]

Defunct Western Carolinas League teams
Baseball in Greenville, South Carolina
Sports clubs established in 1965
Sports clubs disestablished in 1966